"Energy" is a song performed by American singer Melissa Manchester, from her 1985 album Mathematics.

Details
The song was arranged by veteran songwriter Greg Mathieson and was released as the second single from the album, following the underperformance of the lead single "Mathematics", MCA hoped to reverse the album's fortune by releasing this Hi-NRG track with an aim for the club market.

Melissa Manchester filmed a videoclip to promote the song, which sees the singer and her band in a sort of industrial-setting stage performing the song.

The single was released on 7" and 12" formats featuring remixes, but it failed to chart either on the Billboard Hot 100 or the dance charts, and failed to chart elsewhere. The b-side to the single was a non-album song, called "So Full Of Yourself", which was co-written by Manchester and Tom Snow and used as the b-side to all 3 singles off the album.

Personnel
Melissa Manchester: Lead vocals
Greg Mathieson, Richard Gibbs: Synthesizer, keyboards
Lee Ritenour, Michael Landau, Trevor Veitch: Guitar
Abraham Laboriel: Bass guitar
Carlos Vega: Drums
Richard Page, Steve George: Backing vocals

Track listings
7" single
 "Energy" – 3:36
 "So Full of Yourself" – 3:36

12" single 
 "Energy (Power mix) – 5:20
 "Energy" (Dub version) – 4:10

Duck Sauce version

American-Canadian DJ duo Duck Sauce sampled the chorus of Manchester's song to create "NRG", which was released as the lead single off their long-awaited debut album Quack in 2014. The song achieved good reviews, but was not a hit, only peaking at number 73 in the Wallonia region of Belgium, and at number 121 in the UK.

The group filmed a music video which mocked late-night infomercials, with Duck Sauce members Armand van Helden and A-Trak watching late-night television that announces NRG, "the everything gel". The informercials, presented by comedian Jon Daly, present the gel as a remedy for different problems, including as a cooking sauce, headaches, dancing in rhythm, sexual vigour, exercise cramps, and more. The last part of the informercials show bizarre side effects consuming the product might give. The last part of the videoclip shows Duck Sauce DJing at a club for all the people involved in the commercials.

Music Video
The music video is directed by Dugan O' Neal, It's a video about a product called NRG.

References

1985 singles
1985 songs
2014 singles
Duck Sauce songs
MCA Records singles
Melissa Manchester songs